C84 may refer to :
 Ruy Lopez chess openings ECO code
 Peripheral and cutaneous T-cell lymphomas ICD-10 code
 Right of Association (Non-Metropolitan Territories) Convention, 1947 code
 Caldwell 84 (NGC 5286), a globular cluster in the constellation Centaurus
 Condemned 84, British band